The South Negril River is a river in Westmoreland, Jamaica.

Course

From Retreat the river arcs clockwise to flow north west out of the sugar cane into an area of swampy ground. After a further  it enters a region of small low hills, flowing through a defile in the middle of these for another  before emerging to pass under a bridge carrying the Springfield - Sheffield road. 

Returning to flat agricultural terrain it continues north and west a little further, then arcs anti clockwise round another small hill to establish the westerly tendency which will carry it to the sea. At the end of this  section it passes under a small bridge carrying the Springfield - Sheffield road and reaches the south east corner of the Great Morass just north of the village of Sheffield.

Over its final  the river broadens dramatically as it flows along the southern edge of the Great Morass, gathering water as it goes, finally entering a culverted section and passing under its largest bridge (which carries the southern end of the main road paralleling Negril's seven mile beach) and out into the Caribbean Sea.

Along its route the river passes a number of small settlements and named regions including (working downstream from east to west):

Spring Garden
Saint Pauls
Retreat
Top Hill
Negril Spots
Cato
Springfield
Sheffield
Nonpariel
Whitehall
Negril Town

Throughout its  length the river falls no more than  giving it a very gentle average gradient of about 1 in 200.

Infrastructure
Working downstream from source to mouth the South Negril River passes under:
Two small road bridges carrying the New Hope - Delve Bridge road.
A small road bridge carrying the Springfield - New Hope road.
Five cane field service road plank bridges, north of Retreat.
A small road bridge north of Springfield carrying the Springfield - Sheffield road.
A pipe bridge north of Sheffield.
A road bridge carrying the southern end of the main road paralleling Negril's seven mile beach. This modest structure is the largest bridge over the river.

Tributaries
The South Negril River has no tributaries of any consequence.

See also
List of rivers of Jamaica

References
General
Ford, Jos C. and Finlay, A.A.C. (1908).The Handbook of Jamaica. Jamaica Government Printing Office

Inline

External links
Aerial view of mouth
Aerial view of source

Rivers of Jamaica
Geography of Westmoreland Parish